The 1999 Monte Carlo Rally (formally known as the Rallye Automobile de Monte-Carlo 1999) was the first round of the 1999 World Rally Championship. The race was held over three days between 18 January and 20 January 1999, and was won by Tommi Mäkinen, his 16th win in the World Rally Championship.

Itinerary 
All dates and times are CET (UTC+1).

Results

References 

1999 World Rally Championship season
Monte Carlo Rally
1999 in Monégasque sport
1999 in French motorsport